This is a list of  Time Team episodes from series 16. The series was released on DVD (region 2) in 2013.

Episode

Series 16

Episode # refers to the air date order. The Time Team Specials are aired in between regular episodes, but are omitted from this list. Regular contributors on Time Team include: Tony Robinson (presenter); archaeologists Mick Aston, Phil Harding, Helen Geake, Francis Pryor, Brigid Gallagher, Jackie McKinley, Raksha Dave, Matt Williams, Faye Simpson; Guy de la Bedoyere (Roman historian); Victor Ambrus (illustrator); Stewart Ainsworth (landscape investigator); John Gater (geophysicist); Henry Chapman (surveyor); Paul Blinkhorn (pottery expert), Mark Corney (coin expert); Raysan Al-Kubaisi (computer graphics).

References

External links
Time Team at Channel4.com
The Unofficial Time Team site Fan site

Time Team (Series 16)
2009 British television seasons